Milesia pulchra is a species of hoverfly in the family Syrphidae.

Distribution
Guatemala.

References

Insects described in 1892
Eristalinae
Diptera of North America
Hoverflies of North America
Taxa named by Samuel Wendell Williston